Vladimíra Bujárková is a Paralympian athlete from the Czech Republic competing mainly in category F37 shot put and discus events.

Bujárková first competed in the Paralympics in the 2000 Summer Paralympics edition in Sydney.  There she competed in the F37 javelin and shot and won a silver medal in the F37 discus.  In Athens at the 2004 Summer Paralympics she couldn't quite retain a medal position in the discus in the F37/38 class but made up for it with a silver in the F37/38 shot put.  In the 2008 Summer Paralympics she again competed in the F37/38 shot and discus but this time winning no medals.

External links
 profile on paralympic.org
 Stříbro a bronz pro koulařky Evu Bernou a Vladimíru Bujárkovou at HandiSport.cz

Paralympic athletes of the Czech Republic
Athletes (track and field) at the 2000 Summer Paralympics
Athletes (track and field) at the 2004 Summer Paralympics
Athletes (track and field) at the 2008 Summer Paralympics
Paralympic silver medalists for the Czech Republic
Living people
Medalists at the 2000 Summer Paralympics
Medalists at the 2004 Summer Paralympics
Year of birth missing (living people)
Paralympic medalists in athletics (track and field)
Czech female discus throwers
Czech female shot putters
20th-century Czech women
21st-century Czech women